The Tel Aviv Towers are a complex of four skyscrapers in the city of Tel Aviv, Israel. All four buildings in the complex are complete. Towers 1 and 2 are each 107.75 meters in height, have 34 floors, and were built between 1998 and 2000. Each has 23,000 square metres of residential space and 225 apartments. The towers were designed by Riskin Architects. The original plan was to construct the four towers together.

The towers were shortly Israel's tallest residential buildings and tallest buildings with balconies.

See also
List of skyscrapers in Israel
Architecture of Israel

References

External links
Tel Aviv Tower 1, Tower 2, Tower 3 and Tower 4 at Emporis
Tel Aviv Towers

Residential buildings completed in 2000
Skyscrapers in Tel Aviv
Residential skyscrapers in Israel